Stanisław Tomkiewicz (10 October 1945 – 2 May 2022) was a Polish journalist, farmer, and politician. A member of the Solidarity Citizens' Committee, he served in the Sejm from 1989 to 1991. He died on 2 May 2022 at the age of 76.

References

1945 births
2022 deaths
20th-century Polish politicians
20th-century Polish journalists
20th-century Polish farmers
Members of the Contract Sejm
University of Wrocław alumni
People from Brzesko County
21st-century farmers